Houston, Texas 11-18-1972 is a live album by the rock band the Grateful Dead.  It was recorded on November 18, 1972, at Hofheinz Pavilion in Houston, Texas, and includes most of the second set of the concert.  It was produced as a CD, and also as a limited edition, two-disc vinyl LP, and was released by Rhino Records on November 28, 2014, in conjunction with Record Store Day Black Friday.

Track listing

CD
The track listing for the CD is:
"Bertha" (Jerry Garcia, Robert Hunter) – 5:53
"Greatest Story Ever Told" (Bob Weir, Mickey Hart, Hunter) – 5:04
"He's Gone" (Garcia, Hunter) – 16:05
"Jack Straw" (Weir, Hunter) – 4:47
"Deal" (Garcia, Hunter) – 4:43
"Playing in the Band" (Weir, Hart, Hunter) – 25:49
"Mississippi Half-Step Uptown Toodeloo" (Garcia, Hunter) – 8:45
"Sugar Magnolia" (Weir, Hunter) – 8:45

LP
On the vinyl album the songs are in a slightly different order:
Side A
"Bertha" (Garcia, Hunter) – 5:53
"Greatest Story Ever Told" (Weir, Hart, Hunter) – 5:04
"Deal" (Garcia, Hunter) – 4:43
Side B
"He's Gone" (Garcia, Hunter) – 16:05
"Jack Straw" (Weir, Hunter) – 4:47
Side C
"Playing in the Band" (Weir, Hart, Hunter) – 25:49
Side D
"Mississippi Half-Step Uptown Toodeloo" (Garcia, Hunter) – 8:45
"Sugar Magnolia" (Weir, Hunter) – 8:45

Personnel
Grateful Dead
Jerry Garcia – guitar, vocals
Donna Jean Godchaux – vocals
Keith Godchaux – keyboards
Bill Kreutzmann – drums
Phil Lesh – electric bass, vocals
Bob Weir – guitar, vocals
Production
Produced by Grateful Dead
Original recordings produced by Owsley Stanley
Produced for release by David Lemieux
Executive producer: Mark Pinkus
Associate producers: Doran Tyson, Ivette Ramos
Mastering: Jeffrey Norman
Cover illustration: Gary Houston
Art direction, design: Steve Vance

Concert set list
The set list for the November 18, 1972 concert at Hofheinz Pavilion was:
First set: "Promised Land", "Sugaree", "Mexicali Blues", "Loser", "Black Throated Wind", "Tennessee Jed", "El Paso", "Big Railroad Blues", "Box of Rain", "China Cat Sunflower"> "I Know You Rider", "Beat It On Down the Line", "Brown Eyed Women", "Around and Around", "Casey Jones"
Second set: "Bertha">[a] "Greatest Story Ever Told",[a] "He's Gone",[a] "Jack Straw",[a] "Deal",[a] "Playing in the Band",[a] "Mississippi Half-Step Uptown Toodeloo",[a] "Sugar Magnolia",[a] "One More Saturday Night"
Encore: "Uncle John's Band"
[a] Included in Houston, Texas 11-18-1972

References

Grateful Dead live albums
Record Store Day releases
Rhino Entertainment live albums
2014 live albums